The Planning Commission (denoted as PC) is a financial and public policy development institution of the Government of Pakistan. The Commission comes under Ministry of Planning, Development and Reforms. The Planning Commission undertakes research studies and state policy development initiatives for the growth of national economy and the expansion of the public and state infrastructure of the country in tandem with the Ministry of Finance (MoF).

Since 1952, the commission have had a major influence and role in formulating the highly centralized and planned five-year plans for the national economy, for most of the 20th century in Pakistan. Although the five-year plans were replaced by Medium Term Development Framework, the commission still played an influential and central role in the development of the programme. Furthermore, the Public Sector Development Programmes (PSDP) also placed under the domain of the planning commission. The commission's authoritative figures includes a Chairman who is the Prime Minister, assisted by the deputy chairman, and a science advisor.

Other officials of the commissions includes Planning and Development Secretary of Pakistan; chief economist; Director of the Pakistan Institute of Development Economics; executive director of Policy Implementation and Monitoring (PIM); and members for Social Sectors, Science and Technology, Energy, Infrastructure, and Food and Agriculture.

, the chairman is Prime Minister of Pakistan, Mr. Imran Khan and the current deputy chairman is Dr. Mohammad Jehanzeb Khan, a senior ranking officer of the Pakistan Administrative Service.

History
Prime Minister Liaquat Ali Khan established an independent institution, a Development Board (DB), in the Ministry of Economics Affairs (MoEA) in 1948.

Finally, in 1953, Prime minister Khawaja Nazimuddin decided to give commission to an institution that was set up on 18 July 1953. Ultimately, Zahid Hussain, former Governor of State Bank of Pakistan was appointed its first deputy chairman and two other members.

List of Deputy Chairman Planning Commission
This is the list of the former deputy chairmen of the planning commission of Pakistan.

 Zahid Hussain, 1953 – 1958
 G. Ahmed, 1958 – 1959
 Mumtaz Hassan Khan, 1959 – 1961
 Said Hasan, 1962 – 1966
 M. M. Ahmad, 1967 to 1969
 M. H. Soofi, 1969 to 1970
 Mahboob Ullah Rashid, 1970 – 1971
 Qamar ul Islam, 1971 – 1973
 Prof. Khurshid Ahmad, 30-08-1978 to 21-04-1979
 Mahbub ul Haq, 07-03-1982 to 13-04-1983
 V. A. Jafary, 22-09-1985 to 10-07-1986
 A G N Kazi, 10-07-1986 to 23-08-1993
 Saeed Ahmed Qureshi, 24-08-1993 to 30-06-1994
 Qazi M. Alimullah, 01-07-1994 to 05-11-1996
 Dr. Hafiz Pasha, 12-11-1996 to 12-08-1998
 Ahsan Iqbal, 13-08-1998 to 12-10-1999
 Dr. Shahid Amjad, 27-07-2000 to 08-08-2003
 Engr. Dr. M. Akram Sheikh, 15-03-2004 to 07-05-2008
 M. Salman Faruqui, 09-05-2008 to 28-11-2008
 Sardar Assef Ahmed Ali, 29-11-2008 to 13-01-2010
 Dr. Ishfaq Ahmad, 15-01-2010 to 31-04-2010
 Dr. Nadeem ul Haque 01-05-2010 to 07-06-2013
 Ahsan Iqbal, 08-06-2013 to 28-07-2017
 Sartaj Aziz, 13-08-2017 to 31-05-2018
 Khusro Bakhtiar, 20-08-2018 to 01-08-2019
 Dr. Jehanzeb Khan, 01-08-2019 to present

Vision 2025

The Vision 2025 is the country's long–term development blueprint which aims to create a globally competitive and prosperous country providing a high quality of life for all its citizens.
 Vision 2025 Director: Dr Asif Chishti

Priority Areas
 Integrated Energy
 Modernization of Infrastructure
 Institutionalreform and modernization of the public sector
 Value-addition in Commodity Producing Sectors
 Export promotion
 Water and food security
 Private sector-led growth and entrepreneurship

Pakistan Institute of Development Economics

The Pakistan Institute of Development Economics, is a post-graduate research institute, and a public policy think tank located in the vicinity of Islamabad, Pakistan.

Pakistan Planning and Management Institute

The Pakistan Planning and Management Institute (PPMI) is the one of the division of Planning Commission. The main objectives of PPMI are 
to improve technical and analytical skills and enhance expertise of the federal, provincial and district governments’ officers through training in 
areas of Project Management, Social development and application of Information Technology in Project management.

Federal Drought Emergency Relief Assistance (DERA) Unit

The function of DERA Unit is to facilitate the implementation of the project in the drought-hit areas of all the four provinces and coordinate activities carried out in the provinces to mitigate the effects of drought.

See also
 Five-year plans of Pakistan
 Ministry of Planning and Development

References

External links
 Official Website
 National Fertilizer Development Centre
 Centre for Rural Economy
 Pakistan Institute of Development Economics

Financial regulatory authorities of Pakistan
Economy of Pakistan
Economic planning in Pakistan
Ministry of Planning and Development
Pakistan federal departments and agencies
1952 establishments in Pakistan
Government agencies established in 1952